Gersemia juliepackardae is a species of soft coral in the family Nephtheidae. It is found in the northeast Pacific Ocean, on seamounts or on the deep ocean bed. The coral is named in honour of Julie Packard, the executive director of the Monterey Bay Aquarium, for "her dedication to ocean stewardship and conservation, and for elevating public awareness about the ocean environment."

Description
Colonies of Gersemia juliepackardae have an upright main stem and are attached to the substrate by a holdfast. Lateral branches start just above the holdfast and are borne mostly in two opposite rows. Each of these lateral branches develop several secondary branchlets near the tip. The non-retractable polyps are tubular in shape and are mostly on the secondary branches. The eight tentacles on each polyp can be retracted into the polyp body. The holdfast and basal part of the stalk are white while the rest of the stalk and the branches are pink.

Distribution
Observations from a remotely operated underwater vehicle show that most specimens are attached to rock substrates singly, or in small groups, while some grow on dead and living sponges; these may be the first examples known where octocorals in the deep sea are living on sponges.

References

Nephtheidae
Animals described in 2009
Cnidarians of the Pacific Ocean